Carlton + Godard = Cinema is a 2003 Australian documentary about the Carlton film scene of the 1960s, including the work of such directors as Giorgio Mangiamele, Brian Davies, . It includes excerpts from films such as:
 Il Contratto (1953)
 The Brothers (1958)
 Ninety-Nine Percent (1963)
 Clay (1965)
 Pudding Thieves (1967)
 Brake Fluid (1969), 
 The Girlfriends (1967)
 Hey Al Baby (1969)
 Nothing Like Experience (1970)
 Sympathy in Summer (1970)
 Yackety Yack (1974)

It features interviews from filmmakers such as Antony I. Ginnane.

References

External links
 
 screener at YouTube

2003 films
Australian documentary films
2000s English-language films
Films directed by Nigel Buesst